Gladiolus italicus is a species of gladiolus known by the common names Italian gladiolus, field gladiolus, and common sword-lily.
It is native to much of Eurasia and North Africa, but it is well known on other continents where it is a common weed, particularly of cultivated fields and waste places. This perennial flower grows an erect stem approaching a meter in maximum height with a few long leaves around its base. Toward the top half of the generally unbranching stem is a spike inflorescence on which flowers appear at intervals. Each plant has up to 15 or 16 flowers. The flower is bright pink to magenta and several centimeters long with its stamens and style protruding from the throat. The fruit is a capsule about a centimeter long containing many seeds.

References

External links

Jepson Manual Treatment
USDA Plants Profile
Photo gallery

italicus
Flora of Europe
Flora of Asia
Flora of North Africa
Plants described in 1768
Taxa named by Philip Miller